Mandi Bahauddin railway station is located in Mandi Bahauddin city, Mandi Bahauddin district of Punjab province of the Pakistan.

See also
 List of railway stations in Pakistan
 Pakistan Railways

References

External links

Railway stations on Shorkot–Lalamusa Branch Line
Railway stations in Mandi Bahauddin District